Badachi is a village in Belgaum district in the southern state of Karnataka, India. It is located in Athani Taluka of Belgaum District, near Bijapur -Athani Highway. Maashahibi Darga is situated in the village managed by native Mulla(s) .Allabax S MULLA, Peeralal s mulla, Badashahlal d mulla and every year Maashahibi and Shakarbashah Uras is happen in April or may month, 

Badachi is a small Village/hamlet in Athani Taluk in Belgaum District of Karnataka, India. It comes under Badachi Panchayath. It belongs to Belgaum Division . It is located 139 km towards North from District headquarters Belgaum. 12 km from Athni. 578 km from State capital Bangalore Badachi Pin code is 591230 and postal head office is Kokatnur .

Parthanahalli ( 10 km ), Athni ( 11 km ), Gundewadi ( 12 km ), Naganur P K ( 12 km ), Kohalli ( 13 km ) are the nearby Villages to Badachi. Badachi is surrounded by Jamkhandi Taluk towards South, Jath Taluk towards North, Kavathemahankal Taluk towards North, Raybag Taluk towards west .

Terdal, Rabkavi Banhatti, Mahalingpur, Mudhol are the nearby Cities to Badachi.

Badachi 2011 Census Details 
Badachi Local Language is Kannada. Badachi Village Total population is 3985 and number of houses are 774. Female Population is 48.7%. Village literacy rate is 49.7% and the Female Literacy rate is 21.3%. Badachi Census More Details.

Population

Politics in Badachi 
JD(U), BJP, INC are the major political parties in this area.

Polling Stations /Booths near Badachi 
1)Govt. Kannada Higher Primary School New Building North Room No.2 Zhunjarwad

2)Govt. Kannada Higher Primary School New Building Room No.2 Badachi

3)Govt. Kannada Higher Primary School Old Building Room No.1 Ramavadi (hulagabali)

4)Nammura Govt. Higher Primary School Eastern From North Room No.2 Motagi Tota Athani Rural

5)Nammura Govt. Higher Primary School Western Room Aigali Tota Athani Rural

HOW TO REACH Badachi

By Road 
Athni is the Nearest Town to Badachi. Athni is 8 km from Badachi. Road connectivity is there from Athni to Badachi.

By Rail 
There is no railway station near to Badachi in less than 10 km.

References

Villages in Belagavi district